David Wolf (born 15 September 1989) is a German professional ice hockey player who currently plays for Adler Mannheim of the Deutsche Eishockey Liga (DEL). He played five seasons in the Deutsche Eishockey Liga (DEL) for the Hannover Scorpions and Hamburg Freezers between 2009 and 2014 before moving over to North America. Internationally, Wolf has represented Germany at both the junior and senior levels.

Playing career
Wolf's first full season of professional hockey was the 2007–08 season. He appeared in 46 games for ETC Crimmitschau in the 2nd Bundesliga, the second level of German hockey. Following a 9-point season, Wolf returned to ETC Crimmitschau for the 2008–09 season, where he scored 8 points and recorded 120 penalty minutes in 36 games. Wolf was a member of the German national junior team at the 2009 World Junior Ice Hockey Championships. He scored one goal in the tournament against Canada, and recorded 53 penalty minutes in six games.

In 2009–10, Wolf moved up to the Deutsche Eishockey Liga (DEL) and joined the Hannover Scorpions. He played two seasons with Hannover before moving to the Hamburg Freezers in 2011. He earned a place on Hamburg's top line and enjoyed a dramatic increase in his offensive production; Wolf scored 35 points in 46 games in 2011–12 after recording only 6 in 51 games the year before. He also led the DEL with 167 penalty minutes. The National Hockey League's (NHL) Toronto Maple Leafs offered Wolf a try-out at their 2012 summer camp but he failed to stick with the team.

Wolf returned to Hamburg for the 2012–13 season, scoring a career-high 17 goals and adding 19 assists. He improved to 40 points the following season and again led the DEL in penalties with 152 minutes. Wolf also played with the German national team in that country's failed attempt to qualify for the 2014 Winter Olympics. Following the 2013–14 DEL season, Wolf left Germany intending to try to make the NHL. He signed a one-year, two-way contract with the Calgary Flames. The Flames assigned him to their American Hockey League (AHL) affiliate, the Adirondack Flames to begin the 2014–15 season. He scored 12 goals and added nine assists in his first 35 games with Adirondack before earning his first recall to Calgary on 26 Jan. 2015. Wolf made his NHL debut on 31 Jan., a 4–2 victory over the Edmonton Oilers. He suffered a laceration to this thigh during the game and missed the next three games due to the injury.

Wolf turned down offers to remain in North America and returned to Germany for the 2015-16 season, again signing with the Hamburg Freezers. Following the 2015-16 campaign, he was traded to fellow DEL side Adler Mannheim in exchange for Martin Buchwieser. Wolf signed a seven-year deal with the Adler organization.

Personal life
Wolf is a second-generation hockey player. His father, Manfred, was born in Canada but played professionally in Germany and twice represented West Germany at the Winter Olympics.

Career statistics

Regular season and playoffs

International

Awards and honours

References

External links
 

1989 births
Living people
Adirondack Flames players
Adler Mannheim players
Calgary Flames players
Fischtown Pinguins players
German ice hockey left wingers
Hamburg Freezers players
Hannover Scorpions players
Ice hockey players at the 2018 Winter Olympics
Medalists at the 2018 Winter Olympics
Olympic ice hockey players of Germany
Olympic medalists in ice hockey
Olympic silver medalists for Germany
Sportspeople from Düsseldorf
Undrafted National Hockey League players
Ice hockey players at the 2022 Winter Olympics